Lunning is a coastal hamlet in Mainland, Shetland Islands, Scotland, United Kingdom; the nearest settlement is Vidlin, and it is within the parish of Nesting. There is a standing stone near the settlement.

References 

Hamlets in Scotland
Villages in Mainland, Shetland